The 1968 United States presidential election in Wyoming took place on November 5, 1968. All 50 states and the District of Columbia were part of the 1968 United States presidential election. State voters chose three electors to the Electoral College, who voted for president and vice president.

Wyoming was won by the Republican nominees Richard Nixon of New York and his running mate Spiro Agnew of Maryland. Nixon and Agnew defeated the Democratic nominees, incumbent Vice President Hubert Humphrey of Minnesota and his running mate Edmund Muskie of Maine.

Nixon carried Wyoming with 55.76% of the vote to Humphrey's 35.51%, a victory margin of 20.25%. Also on the ballot was former and future Alabama Governor George Wallace, running as an Independent in Wyoming. Although Wallace carried five states in the South, he had only modest appeal in Wyoming. His performance was the best by any third-party candidate in Wyoming since Robert La Follette won nearly a third of the vote in 1924, but nonetheless did not equal his vote share in the fellow Western states of Alaska, Idaho and Nevada.

With 55.76 percent of the popular vote, Wyoming would prove to be Nixon's fifth strongest state in the 1968 election after Nebraska, Idaho, Utah and North Dakota.

Statewide Results

Results by county

See also
 United States presidential elections in Wyoming

Notes

References

1968
Wyoming
1968 Wyoming elections